Vitaliy Danylchenko (born 4 December 1978 in Dnipropetrovsk) is a Ukrainian former competitive figure skater. He is the 1999 Nebelhorn Trophy silver medalist and a five-time Ukrainian national champion. He placed as high as 6th at the European Championships and 13th at the World Championships.
Vitaliy was a member of the Olympic Team for Ukraine. 
Vitaliy performed as a principal skater in professional ice shows for many years. As of 2022, Vitaliy is a full time coach in Charlotte, North Carolina, USA.  He coaches as part of Elite Training Team.  Vitaliy previously coached in New Jersey and California.  He has coached beginner up through world & international competitors.

Programs

Results
GP: Grand Prix; JGP: Junior Series / Junior Grand Prix

References

External links

 

Ukrainian male single skaters
Sportspeople from Dnipro
Living people
1978 births